"Girls" is a song by British girl group Sugababes for their sixth studio album Catfights and Spotlights (2008). It was written by band member Keisha Buchanan along with Anna McDonald and Nicole Jenkinson, while production was helmed by Si Hulbert and Melvin Kuiters. The song was released on 6 October 2008 as the lead single from Catfights and Spotlights. The song is built around an interpolation of  "Here Come the Girls" (1970) by American singer Ernie K-Doe. Due to the inclusion of the sample, Allen Toussaint is also credited as a songwriter.

The song was a moderate success around Europe in comparison with previous single, the song peaked in the top-three in Estonia, and the United Kingdom, and reached the top-twenty in Ireland and Turkey as well as the top-fifty in several countries including Slovakia, Ukraine and the Czech Republic. "Girls" is used as the one of two theme songs of Dagens Mand, the Danish version of Taken Out.

Release and reception
"Girls" received positive reviews from critics. Nick Levine from Digital Spy stated that "Around it they've built a brassy, funky, Ronsonish pop song with lyrics that push all the usual female empowerment buttons. The result is smart, catchy and very, very 2008 – and it sounds pretty good on the radio too. But it's also the first lead single from a Sugababes album that it's difficult to get excited about". Lucy Davies from BBC Music found that the song has them "happily stomp their attitudes all over it until you can't remember it being anyone else's."

In the United Kingdom, "Girls" entered two weeks prior to its physical release, on downloads, at number 8. The following week it climbed four more spots to number 4. The week of 13 October 2008, it climbed one spot to number 3. "Girls" marked their first lead single not to reach number 1 since their debut "Overload" in 2000. In Ireland, the song peaked at number 12 on the Irish Singles Chart. Though "Girls" was not officially released in the United States, it was used in commercials to promote American shoe store Payless and the department store J. C. Penney in 2009.

Music video
The music video for "Girls" was filmed on 28 August 2008, and directed by Daniel Wolfe, The video premiered on 4Music and Channel 4 on 6 September 2008.

While Big Brother: Celebrity Hijack contestant Latoya Satnarine is featured in a cameo appearance, Buchanan invited her boyfriend Dean Thomas to star in a supporting role in the video. After recruiting female fans to star in the video, producers denied accusations they were being unfair by failing to pay those who starred in the video.
A spokesman for the band later stated: "No professional dancers are being asked to do anything for free. This is an opportunity for people who don’t dance for a living but who fancy their chances."

Formats and track listings

Notes
  signifies additional producer

Credits and personnel
Credits adapted from the liner notes of Catfights and Spotlights.

Amelle Berrabah – vocals
Keisha Buchanan – vocals, writing
Tom Elmhirst – mixing
Scott Garland – saxophone
Si Hulbert – keyboards, production, programming
Nicole Jenkinson – writing
Melvin Kuiters – production

Anna McDonald  – writing
Dave Palmer – engineering
Dan Parry – mixing assistance
Heidi Range – vocals
Mike Stevens – vocal production
James Treweek – brass

Charts

Weekly charts

Year-end charts

Certifications

Release history

References

2008 singles
2008 songs
Articles containing video clips
Funk songs
Island Records singles
Songs written by Allen Toussaint
Songs written by Keisha Buchanan
Sugababes songs